Chaminda is a given name. Notable people with the name include:

Chaminda Darman (born 1978), Sri Lankan cricketer
Chaminda Mendis (born 1968), former Sri Lankan cricketer
Chaminda Niroshan, Sri Lankan cricketer
Chaminda Ruwan (born 1979), Sri Lankan born cricketer
Chaminda Ruwan Yakandawala (1971–2006), Sri Lankan soldier
Chaminda Vaas (born 1974), Sri Lankan cricketer
Chaminda Vidanapathirana (born 1983), Sri Lankan cricketer
Jude Chaminda (born 1973), Sri Lankan born cricketer